The inaugural Test series between the New Zealand and South Africa national cricket teams took place in New Zealand in February and March 1932. South Africa won both matches of the two-match series. New Zealand were captained by Curly Page and South Africa by Jock Cameron.

Test series summary

First Test

Second Test

References

External links
 South Africa in New Zealand, 1931-2 at Cricinfo
 South Africa in Australia and New Zealand 1931-32 at CricketArchive
 Quick, Cold, A Little One-Sided at NZ Cricket Museum
 Tour of Australia & New Zealand 1931-32 at Test Cricket Tours

1932 in South African cricket
1932 in New Zealand cricket
New Zealand cricket seasons from 1918–19 to 1944–45
1931-32
International cricket competitions from 1918–19 to 1945